The 1967–68 Iowa Hawkeyes men's basketball team represented the University of Iowa in intercollegiate basketball during the 1967–68 season. The team was led by Ralph Miller and played their home games at the Iowa Field House. The Hawkeyes finished the season 16–9 and were Big Ten co-champions with a 10-4 conference record.

Senior guard Sam Williams was named Big Ten Player of the Year after averaging 25.3 points per game and 10.9 rebounds per game. It would be 52 years before another Iowa men's basketball player would take home the award.

Roster

Schedule/results

|-
!colspan=9 style=| Regular season
|-

|-
!colspan=9 style=|Big Ten Playoff
|-

Source:

Awards and honors
 Sam Williams – Third-Team AP All-American; Big Ten Player of the Year

Team players in the 1968 NBA Draft

References

Iowa Hawkeyes men's basketball seasons
Iowa
Hawkeyes
Hawkeyes